Bhattadeva (1558–1638)(অসমীয়া: বৈকুণ্ঠনাথ ভাগৱত ভট্টাচাৰ্য), (Baikunthanatha Bhagavata Bhattacharya) is acknowledged as the father of Assamese prose. Though Bhaktiratnakar-katha, the Assamese translation of Sankardev's Sanskrit composition Bhaktiratnakar by Gopala Charana Dwija preceded the works of Bhattadeva, Bhattadeva's prose had an influence in the development of a high and dignified style.  Bhattadeva's and Gopala Charana Dvija's 16th century works are considered to be the earliest examples of prose in Indian languages. Bhattadeva's erudition in Sanskrit grammar and literature, and his command over the Bhagavata earned him the title of Bhagavata Bhattacharya.

Biography
Bhattadeva was born to Chandra Bharati and Tara Devi in a Brahmin family of Bichankuchi, Bajali (Kamrup). After finishing his education he became a disciple of Damodara Deva and succeeded him as the head of Patbausi satra at Barpeta.  He established the Byaskuchi satra some time later where he died. He is best known for Katha Bhagavat and Katha Gita, though some minor works like Saranamalika and Prasangamala are also ascribed to him.

Work
Bhattadeva began translating the Sanskrit Bhagavata into Assamese prose at the bidding of Damodaradeva, who wanted it to be accessible to the common man. He rendered Katha Bhagavata in a discursive style that is dignified and balanced.  He maintains the same sense of dialogue in the Katha Gita.  Though he uses short sentences, popular vocabulary and the expressive cadence of the colloquial, he uses Sanskrit vocables heavily and his language is an elevated one. After completing the Bhagavata and the Gita, he rendered the Bhaktiratnavali into elegant prose. He also compiled a book of devotional verses in Sanskrit gleaned from the Upanishads, Puranas and Samhitas illustrating all the elements of Bhakti. The work, Bhakti-Viveka reveals extensive knowledge and erudition of Bhattadeva, from the vedic to the puranic literature. Bhattadeva's contributions are not confined to prose literature, he wrote poetry also.

Bhattadev University of Assam is named after him.

See also
 Hema Saraswati
 Haribara Vipra

References

Bibliography

Kamrupi literary figures
Kamrupi poets
1558 births
1638 deaths
16th-century Indian poets
17th-century Indian poets